Muthukkal Moondru is a 1987 Indian Tamil-language film directed by A. Jagannathan. The film stars Sivaji Ganesan, Sathyaraj, Pandiarajan and Ranjini.

Cast 

Sivaji Ganesan
Sathyaraj
Pandiarajan
Ranjini
Radha Ravi
Ambika in Guest appearance
Thengai Srinivasan
Thyagu
Manorama
 Haja Sheriff
Baby Sujitha

 Indira

Soundtrack 
Soundtrack was composed and lyrics by T. Rajendar.
"Ennayya Manasilu" - K. S. Chithra
"Devan Koil" – K. J. Yesudas
"Mama Mama" - Chithra
"Vazhgave" - Malaysia Vasudevan
"Aazham Thriyama" – Malaysia Vasudevan, Chithra
"Poove Chinna" – Malaysia Vasudevan, Chithra

Reception 
N. Krishnaswamy of The Indian Express said, "It is a hell of a story. Attempted rape, rape, suicide, murder, revenge, songs, dances, fights, all pieced together in an absurd, thoroughly contrived, exploitative jumble".

References

External links 
 

1987 films
1980s Tamil-language films
Indian action thriller films
Films directed by A. Jagannathan
1987 action thriller films